Ogmoderidius is a genus of beetles in the family Cerambycidae, containing the following species:

 Ogmoderidius aethiopicus Breuning, 1958
 Ogmoderidius flavolineatus Breuning, 1943
 Ogmoderidius flavovittatus Breuning, 1968
 Ogmoderidius gardneri Breuning, 1960
 Ogmoderidius nebulosus Breuning, 1939

References

Apomecynini
Taxa named by Stephan von Breuning (entomologist)